Introducing Gary Petty is an Australian comedy series produced for The Comedy Channel in 2000. The series revolves around Bob Franklin as Gary Petty, a man who is obsessed with revenge on those he feels have snubbed him or have committed social injustices.

Cast
 Bob Franklin as Gary Petty
 Elise McCredie as Virge Snell
 Francis Greenslade as Edwin
 Deidre Rubenstein as Nancy
 Aidan Fennessy as Jude Grey
 Saskia Post as Emily
 Brian Nankervis as Raymond J. Bartholomeuz

Episodes
 The Bookie Who Did Me Wrong
 The Flight Attendant Who Did Me Wrong
 The Antique Dealer Who Did Me Wrong
 The Parrot Who Did Me Wrong
 The Girl From School Who Did Me Wrong
 The Cubby House Club Who Did Me Wrong

See also
 List of Australian television series

References

External links
 Introducing Gary Petty Screen Australia

Australian comedy television series
The Comedy Channel original programming
2000 Australian television series debuts
2000 Australian television series endings